Donetske is a village in Izium Raion of Kharkiv Oblast in eastern Ukraine. It belongs to Oskil rural hromada, one of the hromadas of Ukraine.

Demographics
Native language as of the Ukrainian Census of 2001:
 Ukrainian 84.68%
 Russian 11.91%
 Others 3.41%

References

Villages in Izium Raion